The Asian conical hat is a simple style of conically shaped sun hat originating in East, South and Southeast Asia; and notable in modern-day nations and regions of China, Taiwan, parts of Outer Manchuria, Bangladesh, Bhutan, Cambodia, India, Indonesia, Japan, Korea, Laos, Malaysia, Myanmar, Philippines, Nepal, Tibet, Thailand, and Vietnam. It is kept on the head by a cloth (often silk) or fiber chin strap.

Regional names 
English terms for the hat include sedge hat, rice hat, paddy hat, bamboo hat, andhistorically but now only offensivelycoolie hat.

Use
Asian conical hats are, throughout Asia, primarily used as a form of protection from the sun and rain. When made of straw or other woven materials, it can be dipped in water and worn as an impromptu evaporative cooling device.

China 
In China, it was typically associated with farmers, while mandarins wore tighter circular caps, especially in the winter. There are several conical hat types worn during the Qing dynasty (see Qing official headwear).

Japan 

Philippines 

In the Philippines, the salakot is more commonly a pointed dome-shape, rather than conical, with a spike or knob finial. Unlike most other mainland Asian conical hats, it is characterized by an inner headband in addition to a chinstrap. It can be made from various materials including bamboo, rattan, nito, bottle gourd, buri straw, nipa leaves, pandan leaves, and carabao horn. The plain type is typically worn by farmers, but nobles in the pre-colonial period (and later principalia in the Spanish period) crafted ornate variations with jewels, precious metals, or tortoiseshell. These are considered heirloom objects passed down from generation to generation within families.

The salakot was also commonly worn by native soldiers in the Spanish colonial army. It was adopted by Spanish troops in the early 18th century as part of their campaign uniform. In doing so, it became the direct precursor of the pith helmet (still called salacot or salacco in Spanish and French).

Vietnam 

Special conical hats in Vietnam contain colourful hand-stitch depictions or words while the  varieties are famous for their  (lit. poem conical hats). These contain random poetic verses and Chữ Hán which can be revealed when the hat is directed above one's head in the sunlight. In modernity, they have become part of Vietnam's national costume.

Others 
In India, Bangladesh and Borneo, the plain conical hat was worn by commoners during their daily work, but more decoratively-colored ones were used for festivities. In Sabah, the colorful conical hat is worn for certain dances while in Assam they are hung in homes as decoration or worn by the upper classes for special occasions.

Gallery

See also
 List of hats and headgear
 Ngob
 Gat
 Fulani hat
 Pointed hat
 Pilgrim's hat
 Mokoliʻi, an island in Hawaii with a nickname "Chinaman's Hat"

References

External links

 Conical straw hats gallery

Burmese headgear
Chinese headgear
Pointed hats
History of Asian clothing
Indian headgear
Japanese headgear
Korean headgear
Philippine headgear
Vietnamese headgear
Thai headgear
Straw objects